Xie Limei (born June 27, 1986) is a Chinese triple jumper.

She won the silver medal at the 2004 World Junior Championships and gold medals at the 2005 Asian Championships and the 2006 Asian Games. She also competed at the 2006 World Indoor Championships without reaching the final. She then finished eighth at the 2007 World Championships and the 2008 World Indoor Championships.

Her personal best jump is 14.90 metres, achieved in September 2007 in Urumqi.

Competition record

References

1986 births
Living people
Athletes (track and field) at the 2008 Summer Olympics
Athletes (track and field) at the 2012 Summer Olympics
Chinese female triple jumpers
Olympic athletes of China
Asian Games medalists in athletics (track and field)
Athletes (track and field) at the 2006 Asian Games
Athletes (track and field) at the 2010 Asian Games
Asian Games gold medalists for China
Asian Games silver medalists for China
Medalists at the 2006 Asian Games
Medalists at the 2010 Asian Games
Sportspeople from Zhangzhou